Archbishop Stepinac High School is an American all-boys' Roman Catholic high school in White Plains, New York. 

It was operated by the Roman Catholic Archdiocese of New York until the 2009–2010 school year, when it became independent of the Archdiocese 

It was founded in 1948 and named after Aloysius Stepinac, who was the Archbishop of Zagreb in Croatia (which was then part of Yugoslavia).

In 1952, Stepinac was appointed a cardinal by Pope Pius XII. Stepinac was beatified by Pope John Paul II in 1998.

History 

The school opened in 1948 with a capacity of 1,360 students. It began with freshman and sophomore years and reached its full complement in 1950.

The school was established after fundraising by the Catholic parishes of Westchester County, under the leadership of Francis Cardinal Spellman, the Archbishop of New York, and the archdiocese's educational officials.

The initial purpose of the school was to establish a full educational program with a diversity of subject choices, leading to a well-rounded student. In addition to the college preparatory program, it offered a general course for boys who wanted to finish their education with high school and enter a trade.  

Boys were taught by an all-male faculty, almost entirely religious in makeup. In its earliest years, the administration of the school was mostly in the hands of priests of the Illinois-based Viatorian order, aided by some New York archdiocesan priests assisted by religious brothers and an occasional layman. All were under the supervision of the principal, Msgr. Joseph Krug.

Resident at the high school and in semi-retirement was the Catholic scholar, educator, and author Edwin Ryan, D.D. (later Msgr. Ryan). He served on occasion as counselor to students as well as a consultant to the archdiocese. 

Students from the school were used as extras in the 1972 film Child's Play directed by Sidney Lumet.

In many sports, Stepinac has many rival schools that include: 

 Chaminade High School
 Fordham Preparatory School
 Holy Cross High School
 Holy Trinity Diocesan High School
 Iona Preparatory School
 Monsignor Farrell High School
 St. Anthony's High School
 St. Francis Preparatory School
 White Plains High School (the now-defunct annual post-season football "Turkey Bowl" on Thanksgiving Day)

Fr. John O'Keefe, the school's president from 1992 to 2004, was permanently removed from ministry in 2016 because of allegations of sexual abuse of a minor.  O'Keefe's suspension was announced in a December 16, 2015, letter to parishioners from New York's archbishop, Cardinal Timothy Dolan, who called the allegation "credible" .

Demographics

Race
The high school is 8.5% Asian, 12.5% Black, 14% Hispanic, 60% White and 5% other.

Program 

The school's administration and faculty is a mix of priests and lay men and women.

The school draws its students predominantly from Westchester County and has evolved into a college-preparatory school. 

The school offers a college-preparatory program, an honors program offering 22 AP classes, and starting in the 2016–2017 school year, an honors academy designed to give students a head start in their respective field. 

The school uses a library of digital textbooks that can be accessed by students on a variety of devices and is vastly less expensive than buying individual textbooks.

Athletics

Football
Stepinac began playing football in 1950 and was one of the initial teams in the Catholic High School Football League when the league was organized in 1954.

In 2017, Stepinac was voted as one of the top-15 most-dominant New York high school football programs since 2006.

The Crusaders have been to five straight CHSFL AAA Championships, winning four of five appearances in 2014, 2015, 2017 and 2018.  

The Crusaders were the New York State Catholic Champions in 2015, 2017 and 2018.

In 2017, the school finished ranked number five in the tri-state area, number one in New York State and number 160 in the nation by MaxPreps.

2014
In 2014, the school's varsity football team won the AAA Championship in the CHSFL. The school had won lower-division championships, but it was the first time the school was League champion since 1955, when it shared the title with Saint Francis Preparatory.

2015 
The 2015 Stepinac Varsity Crusaders went undefeated at 12-0 and won both the Catholic High School Football League (CHSFL) and Catholic High School Athletic Association (CHSAA) Championships to complete an historic season.

On November 28, 2015, the Stepinac Crusaders football team defeated the Monsignor Martin Conference champion Saint Francis High School of Buffalo 42–28 at Grand Island High School to capture their first state championship. The victory marked the end of a 12-game undefeated season.

2016
Stepinac played in the 2016 CHSFL AAA championship game, losing to Cardinal Hayes High School.

2017 
Stepinac won the 2017 Catholic High School Athletic Association (CHSAA) New York State Football Championship.

2018 
Stepinac won the 2018 Catholic High School Athletic Association (CHSAA) New York State Football Championship for the second consecutive year by defeating St. Francis of Buffalo.

Basketball 
Stepinac's basketball team captured a state championship in 2018.

Stepinac's basketball team won the New York Archdiocese Championship in 2020.

Hockey 
In the 2017–18 hockey season the Stepinac Crusaders were undefeated with a 25-0-1 record. The team captured the CHSHL B division championship by defeating Xavier High School in two consecutive games in the best of three championship round.

Wrestling

Archbishop Stepinac's wrestling team won the Catholic league championship during the 2013–2014 season and the 2014–2015 season.

Drama Club 
The school's auditorium is named after Edward Bowes, the host of the Major Bowes Amateur Hour. The theatre hosts programs including the Annual Alumni Theatre, Annual Talent Show, the Fall Dramas, and the Spring Musicals.

Notable alumni 

Archbishop Stepinac High School alumni include:
 Lou Albanoformer professional wrestler and manager
 Alan Aldaactor
 Billy Collins poet; former U.S. Poet Laureate
 Patrick Colucci (also known as Christopher Cole) poet; author, The Closer's Song
 Marty Conlonformer NBA center
 R. J. Davisbasketball player
 Owen FlanaganJames B. Duke Professor of Philosophy, Duke University
 Joe Garagiola, Jr.general manager,  Arizona Diamondbacks
 AJ Griffinbasketball player 
 Gavin HeslopNFL player
 Bob Hyland (class of 1963)former NFL guard
 Malcolm KoonceNFL player, Las Vegas Raiders
 Ray Montgomerybaseball player; executive coach, California Angels
 Eric Ogboguformer NFL linebacker
 Erik Palladinoactor
 Nicholas SpringerWheelchair Rugby player - Paralympic Champion & 2 time World Champion "did not graduate"
 Brian Sweeneybaseball player;  coach, Cleveland Indians
 Chip Taylorsongwriter
 Barry Voightgeologist
 Jon Voightactor
 Chris Watson (born 1975)basketball player
 Trill WilliamsNFL player, Miami Dolphins
 Kevin Zralywine educator

References

External links 
 , the school's official website
 Stepinac Baseball Website
 Stepinac Basketball Website
 Stepinac Football Website
 Stepinac Hockey Website
 Stepinac Lacrosse Website

1948 establishments in New York (state)
 Catholic secondary schools in New York (state)
Educational institutions established in 1948 
High schools in White Plains, New York
Private high schools in Westchester County, New York